Peter Basch (September 23, 1921 – March 15, 2004) was an American magazine and glamour photographer. He was born in Berlin, lived and died in New York City. The main body of his work was produced in the fifties and sixties.

Early life
Peter Basch was born in Berlin, Germany, the only child of Felix Basch and Grete Basch-Freund, both prominent theater and film personalities of the German-speaking world.

In 1933 the family came to New York due to fears of rising anti-Jewish sentiment and laws in Germany. The family had US citizenship because Felix's father, Arthur Basch, was a wine trader who lived in San Francisco. After moving back to Germany, Arthur Basch kept his American citizenship, and passed it to his children and, thence, to his grandchildren.

United States
When the Basch family arrived in New York in 1933, they opened a restaurant on Central Park South in the Navarro Hotel. The restaurant, Gretel's Viennese, became a hangout for the Austrian expatriate community. Peter Basch had his first job there as a waiter. While in New York, Basch attended the De Witt Clinton High School. The family moved to Los Angeles to assist in Basch's father's career, during which time Basch went to school in England.  Upon returning to the United States, Basch joined the Army. He was mobilized in the US Army Air Forces' First Motion Picture Unit, where he worked as a script boy.

Career
After the war, he started attending UCLA, but his mother asked him to join her back in New York. His parents had decided that Basch should be a photographer, and they obtained a photography studio for their son.

For over twenty years, Peter Basch's had a successful career as a magazine photographer.  He was known for his images of celebrities, artists, dancers, actors, starlets, and glamour-girls in America and Europe. His photos appeared in many major magazines such as Life, Look and Playboy.

Publications
Basch authored and co-authored a number of books containing his photographs.

Partial bibliography
Candid Photography (1958 with Peter Gowland and Don Ornitz)
Peter Basch's Glamour Photography (A Fawcett How-To Book) (1958)
Peter Basch photographs beauties of the world (1958)
Camera in Rome (1963 with Nathan and Simon Basch)
Peter Basch Photographs 100 Famous Beauties (1965)
The nude as form and figure (1966)
Put a Girl in Your Pocket: The Artful Camera of Peter Basch (1969)
Peter Basch's Guide to Figure Photography (1975 with Jack Rey)

People photographed by Peter Basch

 Anouk Aimée
 Anita Ekberg
 Ursula Andress
 Barbara Bain
 Carroll Baker
 Brigitte Bardot
 Jean-Paul Belmondo
 Candice Bergen
 Senta Berger
 Marlon Brando
 Horst Buchholz
 Maria Callas
 Capucine
 Claudia Cardinale
 Joan Collins
 Jean Cocteau
 Salvador Dalí
 Catherine Deneuve
 Marlene Dietrich
 Karin Dor
 Françoise Dorléac
 Anita Ekberg
 Jane Fonda
 James Garner
 William Holden
 Rock Hudson
 Christine Kaufmann
 Grace Kelly
 Hildegard Knef
 Daliah Lavi
 Janet Leigh
 Gina Lollobrigida
 Sophia Loren
 Antonella Lualdi
 Silvana Mangano
 Jayne Mansfield
 Lee Marvin
 Marcello Mastroianni
 Micki Marlo
 Wayne Maunder
 Marilyn Monroe
 Jeanne Moreau
 Michèle Morgan
 Julie Newmar
 Ruth Niehaus
 Kim Novak
 Uschi Obermaier
 Bettie Page
 Gregory Peck
 Anthony Perkins
 Diana Ross
 Eva Marie Saint
 Isabel Sarli
 Maria Schell
 Romy Schneider
 Jean Seberg
 Elke Sommer
 Alexandra Stewart
 Susan Strasberg
 Sharon Tate
 Elizabeth Taylor
 Nadja Tiller
 Natalie Wood
 Alida Valli
 Marie Versini
 Monica Vitti
 Susan Harrison

Personal life
In 1950 Peter met , a model/actress from Quebec. They were married in 1951. The couple had a daughter, Michele, in 1952, and a son, Peter Michael, 1956.

External links
Peter Basch Obituary - New York Times

20th-century American photographers
Photographers from Berlin
American people of German-Jewish descent
1921 births
2004 deaths
First Motion Picture Unit personnel
German emigrants to the United States